Vasile Bîtca (born 1 December 1971) is a Moldovan politician who served as Minister of Agriculture, Regional Development and Environment from 18 February 2015 to 20 December 2017.

At the 2014 Moldovan parliamentary election he was elected as Member of Parliament of Moldova as candidate of the Democratic Party of Moldova, but in short time he left the office to become minister.

Between 2007 and 2011 Vasile Bîtca worked as Deputy Mayor of Nisporeni City, and between 2001 and 2015 he served as President of Nisporeni District.

Vasile Bîtca is married to Natalia Bîtcă, with whom he has four daughters.

On 18 May 2020, Bîtca joined, together with the politician Ghenadie Verdeș, the parliamentary group Pro Moldova, which became a political party on 22 June.

Honours
He has been awarded with the following honours:
Order "Credinţă Patriei", class III (2012)
Medal "Crucea comemorativă. Participant la acțiunile de luptă pentru apărarea integrității și independenței Republicii Moldova (1991–1992)"
Medal "Pentru Vitejie" (1992)

References

External links
 Vasile Bîtca at gov.md

1971 births
Living people
Democratic Party of Moldova politicians
Government ministers of Moldova
Moldovan MPs 2014–2018
Moldovan politicians
People from Nisporeni District